Progress in Electromagnetics Research is a peer-reviewed open access scientific journal covering all aspects of electromagnetic theory and applications. It was established in 1989 as Electromagnetic Waves. The editors-in-chief are Weng Cho Chew (Purdue University) and Sailing He (Royal Institute of Technology). Jin Au Kong was the founding editor-in-chief.

Abstracting and indexing 
The journal is abstracted and indexed by the Science Citation Index Expanded, Current Contents, Inspec, Scopus, and Compendex. It is also a member of CrossRef. According to the Journal Citation Reports, the journal had a 2019 impact factor of 1.898. However, it was not listed in 2012 because of "anomalous citation patterns resulting in a significant distortion of the Journal Impact Factor, so that the rank does not reflect the journal's citation performance in the literature".

References

External links 
 

Engineering journals
Electromagnetism journals
Publications established in 1989
English-language journals
Electrical and electronic engineering journals